This is a list of governors of Nyköping County and Södermanland County of Sweden, from 1634 to present.

Footnotes

References

References 
 Södermanland County Board: Landshövdingar i Södermanland sedan 1634

Sodermanland